Hizb ut-Tahrir in Bangladesh is a banned international Islamist organization.

Leadership
Mohiuddin Ahmed, Dhaka University teacher, is the chief coordinator of Hizb ut-Tahrir in Bangladesh. He was forced into retirement after the organization was banned in 2009. He was charged under Anti-terrorism Act in 2016. Shafiur Rahman Farabi, a leader of the organization was charged in the murder of blogger and secular activist Ananta Bijoy Das in March 2017. The group is alleged to have ties with government, security, and university officials.

History
In 1993, Dr Syed Golam Maula had gone to London, United Kingdom to pursue his PhD degree where he was introduced to Hizb ut-Tahrir. He also met Nasimul Gani and Kawsar Shahnewaz in London. After returning to Bangladesh they set up the local chapter on 2000 in a coaching centre in Road 6A, Dhanmondi, Dhaka. Hizb ut-Tahrir was banned on 22 October 2009. The group wants to establish a Kaleefa in Bangladesh and does not support democracy in the country. At the time of its ban, the group listed its address as HM Siddique Mansion, 55/A Purana Paltan, 4th Floor, Dhaka.

The group supported the 2011 Bangladesh coup d'état attempt by some members of Bangladesh Army who had ties with the group. On 9 February 2013 charges were framed against 6 members of the group including chief coordinator Mohiuddin Ahmed. In October 2014 the members of the group clashed with the police after they bought out a rally in Muhammadpur, Dhaka. On 15 June 2016 Golam Faizullah Fahim, a member of the group, was arrested after trying to kill a Hindu college teacher in Madaripur. He died in custody after a “gunfight with police,”. The group had promised legal aid to captured members and support to their families if they died in the terror attacks. As of 2016, 650 members of the group were arrested; of whom 400 were able to secure bail. The group conducts protests outside of mosques and has a well maintained online presence.

In January 2016, six members of the group were expelled from Dhaka University. The organization has been trying to recruit students from different educational institutes in Bangladesh. In October 2016 Hizb ut-Tahrir asked the members of Bangladesh Army to fight against Myanmar over the Rohingya crisis. A number of students and professors of North South University in Bangladesh were arrested over ties to this group and terrorist activities. The government had kept an eye on the university after 7 of its students were arrested for involvement in the Murder of blogger Ahmed Rajib Haider. North South University is private university with about 22,000 students in Dhaka. In 2015 printed material of the group was found in the Library of North South University. Pro-Vice Chancellor Gias Uddin Ahsan was arrested for providing shelter to those involved in the 2016 July Dhaka Attack.

References

Islamism in Bangladesh
Organizations based in Asia designated as terrorist
Terrorism in Bangladesh
Hizb ut-Tahrir
2000 establishments in Bangladesh